David Matsos (born November 12, 1973) is a former Canadian professional ice hockey player. He served as the head coach for the Sudbury Wolves in the Ontario Hockey League until May 23, 2017.  On June 14, 2017 OHL's Hamilton Bulldogs announced that Dave Matsos joined the organization as an associate coach.

On May 16, 1996, after winning a silver medal with Team Canada at the 1996 Men's World Ice Hockey Championships, Matsos signed a multi-year contract as a free agent with the Tampa Bay Lightning.

References

External links

1973 births
Adirondack Red Wings players
Belfast Giants players
Bracknell Bees players
Canadian ice hockey left wingers
Cardiff Devils players
Hamilton Bulldogs (AHL) players
Living people
Sault Ste. Marie Greyhounds players
Canadian expatriate ice hockey players in Northern Ireland
Canadian expatriate ice hockey players in England
Canadian expatriate ice hockey players in Wales
Canadian expatriate ice hockey players in the United States
Canadian expatriate ice hockey players in Germany